Ann, Lady Dummett (born Agnes Margaret Ann Chesney; 4 September 1930 – 7 February 2012) was an English activist, campaigner for racial justice and published author.

Early life and career
Born at St George Hanover Square, London, the daughter of actor Arthur Chesney, she was related to actors Edmund Gwenn and Cecil Kellaway. She attended Ware Grammar School for Girls and Somerville College, Oxford. In 1951 she married the philosopher Michael Dummett. With Evan Luard, Oxford's MP, they founded the Oxford Committee for Racial Integration, forerunner to Oxfordshire Council for Community Relations, and she became a full-time community relations officer.

She went on to work at the Institute of Race Relations, the Joint Council for the Welfare of Immigrants and the Runnymede Trust of which she was director from 1984 to 1987. Dummett died on 7 February 2012 in Oxford, England from unknown causes, six weeks after the death of her husband, Michael.

Publications
A Portrait of English Racism, Penguin, 1973; 
Citizenship and Nationality, Runnymede Trust, London, 1976
A New Immigration Policy, Runnymede Trust, London, 1978
British Nationality: the AGIN guide to the new law (with Ian Martin), published for the Action Group on Immigration and Nationality by the National Council for Civil Liberties, London, 1982; 
Towards a Just Immigration Policy (ed.), Cobden Trust, London, 1986; 
Racially Motivated Crime: responses in three European cities: Frankfurt, Lyons and Rome (ed.), Commission for Racial Equality, London 1997;

References

External links
DUMMETT, (Agnes Margaret) Ann, (Lady Dummett), Who's Who 2012, A & C Black, 2012; online edn, Oxford University Press, March 2012; accessed 9 April 2012.
Ann Dummett: A champion of equality, obituary, Oxford Mail, 1 March 2012; accessed 4 March 2015.

1930 births
2012 deaths
Alumni of Somerville College, Oxford
English activists
English women activists
Writers from London
Wives of knights